Portal da Transparência is a Brazilian government portal dedicated to making public all expenditures of the federal government. It has a list of all expenses and money transfers the federal government has made, including the list of all people receiving Bolsa Família benefits and how much they have received.

External links
 Portal da Transparência Website

Brazilian legislation
Government of Brazil